A choice function (selector, selection) is a mathematical function f  that is defined on some collection X of nonempty sets and assigns some element of each set S in that collection to S by f(S); f(S) maps S to some element of S. In other words, f is a choice function for X if and only if it belongs to the direct product of X.

An example 
Let X = { {1,4,7}, {9}, {2,7} }. Then the function that assigns 7 to the set {1,4,7}, 9 to {9}, and 2 to {2,7} is a choice function on X.

History and importance 
Ernst Zermelo (1904) introduced choice functions as well as the axiom of choice (AC) and proved the well-ordering theorem, which states that every set can be well-ordered. AC states that every set of nonempty sets has a choice function. A weaker form of AC, the axiom of countable choice (ACω) states that every countable set of nonempty sets has a choice function. However, in the absence of either AC or ACω, some sets can still be shown to have a choice function.

(This example shows that the well-ordering theorem implies AC. The converse is also true, but less trivial.)

Choice function of a multivalued map 
Given two sets X and Y, let F be a multivalued map from X and Y (equivalently, is a function from X to the power set of Y).

A function  is said to be a selection of F, if:

The existence of more regular choice functions, namely continuous or measurable selections is important in the theory of differential inclusions, optimal control, and mathematical economics. See Selection theorem.

Bourbaki tau function
Nicolas Bourbaki used epsilon calculus for their foundations that had a  symbol that could be interpreted as choosing an object (if one existed) that satisfies a given proposition. So if  is a predicate, then  is one particular object that satisfies  (if one exists, otherwise it returns an arbitrary object).

However, Bourbaki's choice operator is stronger than usual: it's a global choice operator. That is, it implies the axiom of global choice. Hilbert realized this when introducing epsilon calculus.

See also
 Axiom of countable choice
 Hausdorff paradox
 Hemicontinuity

Notes

References

Basic concepts in set theory
Axiom of choice